Chrysophyllum durifructum is a tree in the family Sapotaceae, native to Brazil.

Description
The bark is scaly. Fascicles feature up to 10 green flowers.

Distribution and habitat
Chrysophyllum durifructum is native to Brazil, where it is only known from an area of Amazonas north of Manaus. Its habitat is in lowland forest.

References

durifructum
Flora of North Brazil
Plants described in 1974